In July 1990, 32 teams of some of North America's brightest college students took to the road in solar-powered vehicles they had built during the previous year and a half. The GM Sunrayce USA route covered more than 1,800 miles, from Florida to Michigan. Three of the top finishers won a trip to Australia in November to compete in the 1990 World Solar Challenge.

Route
Day 1: Mon, July 9: Start in Orlando, Florida; finish in Floral City, FL.
Day 2: Tue, July 10: Start in Floral Park, FL; finish in Tallahassee, FL.
Day 3: Wed, July 11: Start in Tallahassee, FL; finish in Montgomery, Alabama.
Day 4: Thu, July 12: Start in Montgomery, AL; finish in Haleyville, AL.
Day 5: Fri, July 13: Start in Haleyville, AL; finish in Spring Hill, Tennessee.
Day 6: Sat, July 14: Start in Spring Hill, TN; finish in Bowling Green, Kentucky.
Day 7: Sun, July 15: Start in Bowling Green, KY; finish in Louisville, KY.
Day 8: Sun, July 16: Start in Louisville, KY; finish in Indianapolis, Indiana.
Day 9: Mon, July 17: Start in Indianapolis, IN; finish in Greenville, Ohio.
Day 10: Tue, July 18: Start in Greenville, OH; finish in Mason, Michigan.
Day 11: Wed, July 19: Start in Mason, MI; finish in Warren, MI.

Results

References

Solar car races